Canal Tours (former name: DFDS Canal Tours) is an operator of canal tours in the main harbour and canals of Copenhagen, Denmark.

The firm carries 800,000 passengers a year on four different guided tours, the waterbus and during special events.

History
Formerly known as "Havnens Motorfærger" and "Canal Tours Copenhagen", Canal Tours has been operating harbour and canal tours since 1904.

On 14 March 2011 DFDS sold DFDS Canal Tours to the Swedish company .

Routes and time table

Guided tours
The company offers different guided sightseeing tours which depart from either Gammel Strand or Nyhavn. They typically last 60 minutes with departures up to three times an hour. All the tours are in Danish, English and a third language which varies between German, French, Italian, Spanish and Portuguese.

 The tour departing from Gammel Strand covers: Christiansborg Palace - Church of Holmen - Bank of Denmark - Børsen - Copenhagen Opera House - Holmen - The Little Mermaid - Amalienborg Palace - Amalie Garden - Christianshavn - Church of Our Saviour - The Black Diamond - National Museum of Denmark - Gammel Strand
 The tour departing from Nyhavn covers: Copenhagen Opera House - The Little Mermaid - Amalienborg Palace - Amalien Garden - Christianshavn - Church of Our Saviour  - The Black Diamond - National Museum of Denmark - Gammel Strand - Christiansborg Palace - Church of Holmen - Bank of Denmark - Nyhavn

Waterbus hop-on hop-off
The waterbuses provide a non-guided hop-on hop-off service along the entire harbourfront. Since 2010, all the waterbus routes have been joined to form a single itinerary. The Green/Blue route covers the entire harbour from Fisketorvet Shopping Centre to the south to the Trekroner Fortress to the north. A roundtrip takes about 150 minutes. Day tickets valid for 24 hours are available and there are no reservations.

References

External links

 Official website
 Map of routes and time table

Tourist attractions in Copenhagen
Transport in Copenhagen